The California–Texas rivalry (alternatively the Texas–California rivalry) is a rhetorical rivalry between the two U.S. states of California and Texas. California and Texas are the United States' two most populous states. The two largest states in the American Mainland, with the largest economies, they both have a significant amount of state culture. The states are often opposed politically, with California being progressive and generally supporting the Democratic Party, while Texas is conservative and generally supports the Republican Party. Texas is commonly seen as having little government intervention and regulation, while in California the state takes a larger role in public policies. There are also exceptions, discussed as part of the perceived rivalry, in which Texas has increased state intervention against immigration and abortion, and California has reduced state intervention.

Politics

One area in which the rivalry between California and Texas has been described is politics.

The Democratic Party has had a trifecta in California since 2011, while the Republican Party has had a trifecta in Texas since 2003. Democrats have won the United States presidential elections in California in every election since 1992, while Republicans have won the United States presidential elections in Texas in every election since 1980.

California has enacted numerous progressive policies, such as Medicaid expansion, a $15 per hour minimum wage, and significant actions to reduce climate change, hence being hailed as a global leader in climate action. Meanwhile, Texas has adopted various conservative policies, such as reducing taxes, restricting abortion, not raising the minimum wage, and fostering a business-friendly climate.

Voters look to both states for examples of how policies from across the political spectrum would look if implemented nationally. Many companies have moved to Texas due to lower regulations and significant tax incentives, as well as California's stricter response to the COVID-19 pandemic. Elon Musk, the CEO of Tesla, Inc. and SpaceX, has symbolized such business migration – moving Tesla's Gigafactory and global headquarters to Texas. While Texas has largely welcomed new businesses, the fear of socially progressive attitudes migrating to the state from California has led to a degree of backlash in the state, including Texas Governor Greg Abbott running his re-election campaign in 2018 on the slogan "Don't California My Texas."

See also
California v. Texas
California exodus

References

California culture
Texas culture
Regional rivalries